The Tag Islands are a groups of islands in the Delarof Islands subgroup of the Andreanof Islands in the Aleutian Islands chain of Alaska. The largest of them had been registered under its Aleutian name Tagachalugis by Captain Mikhail Tebenkov in 1852, later the whole group was referred to as the Tag Islands.

References

External links

Delarof Islands
Islands of Alaska
Islands of Unorganized Borough, Alaska